Viśvasena (Middle Brahmi:  , r.293–304 CE) was a ruler of the Western Satraps, and the 22nd ruler of the Kshatrapa dynasty. He was the last Kshatrapa ruler of the Chastana family, brother and successor to Bhartrdaman and son of Rudrasena II.

A coin of Visvasena was found in excavations at the Ajanta Caves, in the burnt-brick monastery facing the caves on the right bank of the river Waghora.

His successor was Rudrasimha II.

References

Sources
 

Western Satraps